HPTN 083 is a 2016 clinical trial which compares cabotegravir injections with oral use of  Emtricitabine/tenofovir as pre-exposure prophylaxis ("PrEP") for prevention of HIV/AIDS.

The study seeks to test injectable PrEP as a way to remedy adherence for many patients on a daily pill regimen.

HPTN 083 is the first large scale phase III clinical trial of cabotegravir.

In February 2016 researchers presented the results of the ECLAIR study. That study examined cabotegravir and found no serious safety concerns.

The research is a collaboration of Gilead Sciences, HIV Prevention Trials Network, ViiV Healthcare, National Institute of Allergy and Infectious Diseases.

Local study sites will include John H. Stroger Jr. Hospital of Cook County.

On May 18, 2020, HPTN announced that the long-acting injections had been found to be a highly effective treatment.

References

External links
official page at ClinicalTrials.gov
HPTN 083: The HIV Life Cycle With Cabotegravir, a video provided by HPTN

Clinical trials related to HIV
Clinical trials sponsored by NIAID
2010s in science